Anamari "Ana" Velenšek (born 15 May 1991) is a Slovenian judoka. She won several medals at the world and European championships in 2011–15 and competed at the 2012 and 2016 Olympics, winning a bronze medal in 2016.  In 2015, she won silver at the World Championships.  That year, she also won gold in the Military World Games and bronze at the European Games. She also competed in the women's +78 kg event at the 2020 Summer Olympics in Tokyo, Japan.

She trains at the Sankaku club, in her home town of Celje.  Since 2011, she is part of the Slovenian Armed Forces Athletes Unit.  She is studying for a degree in social care.  Her sister, Klara Apotekar, is also an international judoka.

References

External links

 

1991 births
Living people
Slovenian female judoka
Olympic judoka of Slovenia
Judoka at the 2012 Summer Olympics
Judoka at the 2016 Summer Olympics
Sportspeople from Celje
European Games bronze medalists for Slovenia
European Games medalists in judo
Judoka at the 2015 European Games
Olympic medalists in judo
Olympic bronze medalists for Slovenia
Medalists at the 2016 Summer Olympics
Judoka at the 2019 European Games
Judoka at the 2020 Summer Olympics
21st-century Slovenian women